Birtle is a hamlet within the Metropolitan Borough of Rochdale, in Greater Manchester, England. It lies in the Cheesden Valley, set amongst the Pennines.

Historically a part of Lancashire, Birtle is archaically referred to as Bircle or Birkle  which means Birch Hill. Together with neighbouring Bamford, it formed the civil parish of Birtle-with-Bamford (also known as Birtle-cum-Bamford). It was in Middleton ecclesiastical parish and in Bury poor law Union. In 1933, Birtle-with-Bamford was dissolved with Birtle being amalgamated into the Municipal Borough of Heywood.

The local church is Bircle Church, St. John the Baptist, Castle Hill Road, Bircle, Bury. In addition to the graveyard and garden of remembrance, the Church land includes an area now known as ‘Bircle Church Wood’, which was gifted by the Reverend Trend Smith.

References

Villages in Greater Manchester
Heywood, Greater Manchester